Microcausta is a genus of moths of the family Crambidae.

Species
Microcausta argenticilia (Hampson, 1919)
Microcausta bipunctalis Barnes & McDunnough, 1914
Microcausta cnemoptila (Meyrick, 1931)
Microcausta flavipunctalis Barnes & McDunnough, 1913
Microcausta ignifimbrialis Hampson, 1895

References

Natural History Museum Lepidoptera genus database

Diptychophorini